Unstructured Supplementary Service Data (USSD), sometimes referred to as "quick codes" or "feature codes", is a communications protocol used by GSM cellular telephones to communicate with the mobile network operator's computers. USSD can be used for WAP browsing, prepaid callback service, mobile-money services, location-based content services, menu-based information services, and as part of configuring the phone on the network.

USSD messages are up to 182 alphanumeric characters long. Unlike short message service (SMS) messages, USSD messages create a real-time connection during a USSD session. The connection remains open, allowing a two-way exchange of a sequence of data. This makes USSD more responsive than services that use SMS.

Uses 
When a user sends a message to the phone company network, it is received by a computer dedicated to USSD. The computer's response is sent back to the phone, generally in a basic format that can easily be seen on the phone display. Messages sent over USSD are not defined by any standardization body, so each network operator can implement whatever is most suitable for its customers.

USSD can be used to provide independent calling services such as a callback service (to reduce phone charges while roaming), enhance mobile marketing capabilities or interactive data services.

USSD is commonly used by prepaid GSM cellular phones to query the available balance. The vendor's "check balance" application hides the details of the USSD protocol from the user. On some pay as you go networks, such as Tesco Mobile, once a user performs an action that costs money, the user sees a USSD message with their new balance. USSD can also be used to refill the balance on the user's SIM card and to deliver one-time passwords or PIN codes.

Some operators use USSD to provide access to real-time updates from social-networking websites like Facebook and Twitter. Wikipedia uses USSD to send articles to some feature phones.

USSD is sometimes used in conjunction with SMS. The user sends a request to the network via USSD, and the network replies with an acknowledgement of receipt:
"Thank you, your message is being processed. A message will be sent to your phone."

Subsequently, one or more mobile terminated SMS messages communicate the status and/or results of the initial request. In such cases, SMS is used to "push" a reply or updates to the handset when the network is ready to send them. In contrast, USSD is used for command-and-control only.

Technical details  
Most GSM phones have USSD capability. USSD is generally associated with real-time or instant messaging services. There is no store-and-forward capability, as is typical of other short-message protocols like SMS. In other words, an SMSC is not present in the processing path.

USSD Phase 1, as specified in GSM 02.90, only supports mobile-initiated ("pull") operations. In the core network, the message is delivered over MAP, USSD Phase 2, as specified in GSM 03.90. After entering a USSD code on a GSM handset, the reply from the GSM operator is displayed within a few seconds.

Format
A typical USSD message starts with an asterisk (*) followed by digits that comprise commands or data. Groups of digits may be separated by additional asterisks. The message is terminated with a hash symbol (#).

USSD mode
Mobile-initiated
 USSD/ PULL or USSD/ P2A
 when the user dials a code, e.g. *139# from a GSM mobile handset

Network-initiated
 USSD/ PUSH or USSD/A2P
 when the user receives a push message from the network; primarily used for promotional services

Man-Machine Interface
The codes below are not USSD codes, these are the related Man-Machine Interface (MMI); they are standardized so they are the same on every GSM phone. They are interpreted by the handset first before a corresponding command (not the code itself) is sent to the network. These codes might not always work when using an AT interface; there are standard AT commands defined for each of these actions instead.

BS is the type of bearer service, some valid values are:
 11 for voice
 13 for fax
 16 for SMS (only valid for barring)
 25 for data
 <leave blank> for all.

T is number of seconds for the No Reply Condition Timer, default is 20 seconds if not specified.

See also
 USSD Gateway
 Ultra Mobile Broadband
 Supplementary service codes
 
 SIM Application Toolkit

References

External links
 GSM 04.90 (ETSI EN 300 957, V7.0.1) Specification (USSD) Stage 3 – 3GPP
 3GPP TS 22.030
 What’s the difference between USSD, MMI and SS codes?
 Android USSD codes list (MMI code list)

Mobile telecommunications standards
3GPP standards
GSM standard